The Estadio Angel P. Malvicino is an indoor arena in Santa Fe, Argentina. It mostly hosts basketball matches but also volleyball, futsal, boxing, handball and artistic events. Unión de Santa Fe currently plays at this stadium its home matches for the Torneo Nacional de Ascenso, the second division of the Argentine basketball league system.

The name of the stadium honours Mr. Malvicino, three times president of Unión de Santa Fe: 1980-81, 1995-2003, 2005-2007. Mr. Malvicino donated this stadium entirely to the club.

Facilities
The stadium has a capacity from 4,500 to 7,000 spectators, depending on the type of event to be host. It also has authorities box and a VIP lounge, a press area with eleven booths fully equipped for radio and TV live transmission. There are medical facilities, doping lab, and several changing rooms for athletes and referees.

Events
During the 2002 FIVB Volleyball Men's World Championship this stadium hosted the Group B, conformed by Poland, Italy, Canada and Croatia; and the second round Group J, conformed by Brazil, France, Netherlands and Czech Republic.

Pool B

|}

|}

Pool J

|}

|}

References

CA Unión
Buildings and structures in Santa Fe Province
Sport in Santa Fe Province
Indoor arenas in Argentina
Basketball venues in Argentina
Volleyball venues in Argentina